The Berthelsdorf Formation is a geologic formation in Germany. It preserves fossils dating back to the Carboniferous period.

See also

 List of fossiliferous stratigraphic units in Germany

References
 

Carboniferous System of Europe
Carboniferous Germany
Carboniferous southern paleotropical deposits